Vauréal Peak is a rocky peak at the east side of the entrance to Admiralty Bay, King George Island, in the South Shetland Islands. The name Cap Vauréal was assigned in this location by the French Antarctic Expedition under J.B. Charcot in 1908–10. Air photos now show that the most prominent feature in the vicinity is this peak.

Maps
 Antarctic Digital Database (ADD). Scale 1:250000 topographic map of Antarctica. Scientific Committee on Antarctic Research (SCAR). Since 1993, regularly upgraded and updated.

See also
Carruthers Cliff
Harnasie Hill

References

Mountains of King George Island (South Shetland Islands)